Surjeet Kumar (born 1 June 1990) is representative for India in the sport of Kabaddi. He was a member of the kabaddi team that won a gold medal in the 2014 Asian Games in Incheon.

References

Living people
1990 births
Indian kabaddi players
Asian Games medalists in kabaddi
Kabaddi players at the 2014 Asian Games
Asian Games gold medalists for India
Medalists at the 2014 Asian Games
Place of birth missing (living people)